St Catherine's School (commonly referred to as St Cath's) is a private Anglican Junior and Senior day and boarding school, located in Waverley, an eastern suburb of Sydney, New South Wales, Australia.

Established in 1856 as a school for the daughters of clergy, St Catherine's is the oldest Anglican girls' school in Australia. It is also the oldest private girls' school in Australia. It is a non-selective school, and currently caters for approximately 1,000 girls from Year K to Year 12, including 70 boarders.

The school is affiliated with the Alliance of Girls' Schools Australasia (AGSA), the Junior School Heads Association of Australia (JSHAA), the Association of Heads of Independent Schools of Australia (AHISA), the Australian Boarding Schools' Association (ABSA), and is a founding member of the Association of Heads of Independent Girls' Schools (AHIGS).

St Catherine's has been reviewed by the Good Schools Guide International.

History 
St Catherine's School traces its origins to 1855, when Jane Barker, wife of Frederic Barker, second Archbishop of Sydney, decided to establish a school for the daughters of the clergy. Barker and her husband had travelled throughout New South Wales, and realised that the poor stipends of the clergy in country areas meant that their daughters could not benefit from a good education. Within five months, Barker had raised enough money to secure a premises in Point Piper Road (now Jersey Road), Edgecliff, and had hired Ms Loftus to run the St Catherine's Clergy Daughters School. Barker wished for her school to be modelled on Casterton School, the school attended by the Brontë sisters, who were themselves the daughters of a poor clergyman. The Clergy Daughters School was officially opened in its temporary location on 5 March 1856.

Shortly after the school's opening, Barker was able to secure a land grant of  near Waverley, and began to look towards the creation of a small missionary settlement, including the Clergy Daughters' School, a church, parsonage and a village school. In September 1857, the foundation stone of the new School was laid, and in 1859, the sandstone building which remains the focus of the School today, was completed. Barker continued to be closely involved with the fledgling Clergy Daughters' school until her death in 1876.

When enrolments began to decline during the depression years of 1891–1895, day girls were admitted to the school for the first time. The principal, Ms Darling, also introduced the first school uniform during this time, in the form of an olive green dress.

In 1933, the house system was introduced. After the Second World War, the swimming pool, a new assembly building and the junior school were added amongst other renovations. A new sports centre was opened in 2002.

Houses

Barker was named after the Bishop and Mrs Barker, Casterton House after the school on which St Catherine's was modelled, and the third House was named Bronte as Charlotte Brontë had mentioned Casterton in Jane Eyre. Hulme-Moir and Sutherland were created in 1987.

Headmistresses

Campus 
Since 1859, St Catherine's School has been situated on one suburban campus, currently  in size and featuring a mix of 19th century and modern buildings, gardens and views to the Tasman Sea.

Some notable facilities of the college include the Jo Karaolis Sports Centre, with facilities for netball, tennis, basketball and gymnastics and school functions; the Dame Joan Sutherland Centre for the Performing Arts, featuring a drama theatre, recording studio, dance studio, band room and music practice and teaching areas; computing facilities in the Sutherland Centre; an Independent Learning Centre and Student Meeting Room; swimming pool; Junior School and library; and Year 12 common room and Senior School Library; The Boarding House, uniform shop, deli, museum and playgrounds. After school care facilities are also located on site.

Notable alumnae 
Former students of St Catherine's School are known as "Old Girls" and may elect to join the schools Alumni association, known as the "Old Girls' Union". The Old Girls' Union was established on 11 November 1898 by Miss Charlotte Elizabeth Fox, the Headmistress at the time. At its foundation the aim of the union was to keep past pupils in contact with the school and promote its good, whilst also encouraging younger members to continue furthering their talents after graduation. Some notable Old Girls' of St Catherine's include:

Entertainment, media and the arts
 Eirene Mort – artist
 Mouche Phillips - actress.
 Dame Joan Sutherland – operatic soprano
 Rachael Coopes - actress

Medicine and science
Una Lucy Fielding – pioneering neuroanatomist
Tamara Davis - astrophysicist

Sport
Gabi Simpson- netball 
Lizzie Welborn - surfing
Amy Ridge - water polo

See also 

 List of Anglican schools in New South Wales
 Anglican education in Australia
 List of boarding schools in Australia

References

External links 

 St. Catherine's School website
 Review by the Good Schools Guide International

1856 establishments in Australia
Anglican secondary schools in Sydney
Educational institutions established in 1856
Anglican primary schools in Sydney
Boarding schools in New South Wales
Girls' schools in New South Wales
Association of Heads of Independent Girls' Schools
Junior School Heads Association of Australia Member Schools
Waverley, New South Wales
Alliance of Girls' Schools Australasia